Vails Gate is a hamlet (and census-designated place) in Orange County, New York, United States. The population was 3,368 at the 2020 census. It is part of the Poughkeepsie–Newburgh–Middletown, NY Metropolitan Statistical Area as well as the larger New York–Newark–Bridgeport, NY-NJ-CT-PA Combined Statistical Area.

Vails Gate is in the southern part of the Town of New Windsor, located on Route 32. It is defined largely by the junction of that highway with Routes 94 and 300, a busy commercial center which has the ZIP code 12584. Part of that also spills into adjacent regions of the Town of Cornwall to the south.

History 
The locale has always been referred to as a neighborhood of New Windsor. In the 19th century, it became known as Vail's Gate, after John D. Vail, a former postmaster and keeper of the Blooming Grove Turnpike tollgate.  For the same reason, it was also earlier called Tooker's Gate.  

Vail served as the first postmaster of the New Windsor post office, established on April 10, 1850, being named the Mortonville Post Office. The name was finally changed to Vails Gate Post Office, which led to the apostrophe permanently dropping from the name. Efforts to change the name of the hamlet to Mortonville, after the Morton family, residents of the Ellison House, never occurred.

Historic sites 

 Knox's Headquarters  
 New Windsor Cantonment   
 Edmonston House  
 Vails Gate Methodist Church and Cemetery   
 Brewster's Forge Memorial

Geography
Vails Gate is located at  (41.457943, -74.053484).

Demographics

As of the census of 2000, there were 3,319 people, 1,421 households, and 861 families residing in the CDP. The population density was 3,330.5 per square mile (1,281.5/km2). There were 1,459 housing units at an average density of 1,464.1/sq mi (563.3/km2). The racial makeup of the CDP was 72.34% White, 11.87% African American, 0.39% Native American, 4.19% Asian, 7.17% from other races, and 4.04% from two or more races. Hispanic or Latino of any race were 19.31% of the population.

There were 1,421 households, out of which 28.2% had children under the age of 18 living with them, 43.4% were married couples living together, 11.7% had a female householder with no husband present, and 39.4% were non-families. 32.4% of all households were made up of individuals, and 12.5% had someone living alone who was 65 years of age or older. The average household size was 2.34 and the average family size was 2.98.

In the CDP, the population was spread out, with 23.0% under the age of 18, 6.9% from 18 to 24, 31.2% from 25 to 44, 22.7% from 45 to 64, and 16.2% who were 65 years of age or older. The median age was 38 years. For every 100 females, there were 91.6 males. For every 100 females age 18 and over, there were 88.6 males.

The median income for a household in the CDP was $39,851, and the median income for a family was $44,485. Males had a median income of $38,636 versus $31,019 for females. The per capita income for the CDP was $22,967. About 7.8% of families and 10.4% of the population were below the poverty line, including 12.3% of those under age 18 and 1.9% of those age 65 or over.

References

Census-designated places in New York (state)
Census-designated places in Orange County, New York
Hamlets in New York (state)
New Windsor, New York
Poughkeepsie–Newburgh–Middletown metropolitan area
Hamlets in Orange County, New York